Sebastián Henao Gómez (born 5 August 1993) is a Colombian cyclist, who last rode for UCI WorldTeam . In August 2019, he was named in the startlist for the 2019 Vuelta a España. Henao announced he was suspending his career on 1 August 2022 due to health problems.

Major results

2011
 2nd Overall Vuelta del Porvenir de Colombia
1st Stage 3
 3rd Overall Vuelta de la Juventud de Colombia
2012
 2nd Overall Clásica Marinilla
 4th Overall Clásica Ciudad de Girardot
2013
 1st  Overall Clásica de Funza
1st Stage 1
 1st  Young rider classification Vuelta a Colombia
 3rd Overall Vuelta de la Juventud de Colombia
2015
 3rd Overall Tour de Langkawi
 7th Japan Cup
 9th Overall Tour de l'Avenir
2016
 5th Overall Settimana Internazionale di Coppi e Bartali
 6th Overall Arctic Race of Norway
2018
 8th Overall Vuelta a Burgos
2021
 8th Overall Volta ao Algarve

Grand Tour general classification results timeline

References

External links

 Sebastián Henao profile at Team Sky

Colombian male cyclists
Living people
1993 births
People from Rionegro
Sportspeople from Antioquia Department
21st-century Colombian people